Zvi ( and , Tzvi, Ṣvi, "gazelle") is a Jewish masculine given name. Notable people with this name include:

 Zvi Aharoni (1921–2012), Israeli Mossad agent
 Zvi Arad (1942–2018), Israeli mathematician, acting president of Bar-Ilan University, president of Netanya Academic College
 Zvi Ben-Avraham (born 1941), Israeli geophysicist
 Zvi Bodie, American academic
 Zvi Hirsch Chajes (1805–1855), Orthodox Polish rabbi
 Zvi Chalamish, Israeli financier
 Zvi Elpeleg (1926–2015), Israeli academic
 Zvi Galil (born 1947), Israeli computer scientist, mathematician, and President of Tel Aviv University
 Zvika Greengold (born 1952), Israeli officer during the Yom Kippur War, awarded the Medal of Valor
 Zvi Griliches (1930–1999), Jewish-American economist
 Zvi Hirsch Grodzinsky (born 1857), American rabbi
 Zvi Elimelech Halberstam (born 1952), Israeli rebbe
 Zvi Hecker (born 1931), Israeli architect
 Zvi Heifetz (born 1956), Israeli diplomat
 Zvi Hendel (born 1949), Israeli politician
 Zvi Hercowitz (born 1945), Israeli economist
 Zvi Hirsch Kalischer (1795–1874), Orthodox German rabbi
 Zvi Kolitz (died 2002), Israeli film producer
 Zvi Laron (born 1927), Israeli physician
 Zvi Lieberman (1891–1985), Russian-born Israeli author
 Zvi Luria (1906–1968), Israeli politician
 Zvi Magen (born 1945), Israeli ambassador
 Zvi Mazel (born 1939), Israeli diplomat
 Zvi Mowshowitz (born 1979), American Magic: The Gathering player
 Zvi Nishri (Orloff) (1878–1973), Russian/Palestinian/Israeli pioneer in modern physical education
Zvi Ofer (1932–1968), Israeli officer awarded the Medal of Valor
 Zvi Yaakov Oppenheim (1854–1926), Lithuanian rabbi
 Zvi Hermann Schapira (1840–1898), Russian mathematician
 Zvi Schreiber (born 1969), British-Israeli entrepreneur
 Zvi Segal (1901–1965), signatory of the Israeli Declaration of Independence
 Zvi Sherf (born 1951), Israeli basketball coach
 Zvi Sobolofsky, Orthodox American rabbi
 Zvi Weinberg (1935–2006), Israeli politician
 Zvi Yair (1915–2005), Hungarian rabbi
 Zvi Yavetz (1925–2013), Israeli historian
 Zvi Yehezkeli (born 1970), Israeli journalist
 Zvi Yehuda (died 1965), Israeli politician
 Zvi Yehuda Kook (1891–1982), Jewish theologian
 Zvi Zamir (born 1925), Israeli general
 Zvi Zilker (born 1933), Israeli politician
 Zvi Zimmerman (1913–2006), Israeli politician

See also 
 Zvika
 Ben-Zvi
 David-Zvi

References